Jamie Bowden is the name of:

Jamie Bowden (diplomat) (born 1960), British diplomat
Jamie Bowden (footballer) (born 2001), English footballer